Otter was the second steamship to operate in the Pacific Northwest of North America, following her sister ship and twin, the much more famous Beaver. Otter, a sidewheeler, was used to service trading posts maintained by the Hudson's Bay Company between Puget Sound and Alaska and like her sister Beaver became pressed into service during the Fraser Gold Rush on the Lower Fraser River from 1858 onwards.  From 16 April 1855 to 3 April 1862, Otter was captained by William Alexander Mouat.

She was built in London, for the Hudson's Bay Company.  

She sank on August 21, 1880, but was raised and put back into operation.

She was sold to the Canadian Pacific Navigation Company in 1883.  They converted her to a coal hulk in 1886.

Her hull was burned to recover the copper in 1895.

See also 
 List of steamboats on the Columbia River
 List of ships in British Columbia

References

Victorian-era merchant ships of Canada
Merchant ships of the United States
Paddle steamers of British Columbia
Steamboats of the Columbia River
Pre-Confederation British Columbia
Hudson's Bay Company ships